Sawley is a civil parish in Ribble Valley, Lancashire, England.  It contains twelve listed buildings that are recorded in the National Heritage List for England.  Of these, one is listed at Grade I, the highest of the three grades, and the others are at Grade II, the lowest grade.  The parish contains the village of Sawley and surrounding countryside.  The most important building is Sawley Abbey, now in ruins; it is listed and is also a scheduled monument.  Most of the other listed buildings are houses and associated structures, and farmhouses and farm buildings.  In addition there are two bridges, a public house, and a milestone that are listed.

Key

Buildings

References

Citations

Sources

Lists of listed buildings in Lancashire
Buildings and structures in Ribble Valley